Richard Ellard Cooper (3 January 1947 – 14 March 2005) was a Judge of the Supreme Court of Queensland (2 February 1989 to 30 March 1992) and then a Judge of the Federal Court of Australia (30 March 1992 to 14 March 2005).

Cooper was educated at Sydney Boys High School from 1952–62, he graduated from the University of Queensland with a Master of Laws in 1979. Cooper served on the Queensland Law Reform Commission as deputy chairman from 1999 and as chairman in 1992 and 1993.

References 

Judges of the Federal Court of Australia
1947 births
2005 deaths
University of Queensland alumni
Judges of the Supreme Court of Queensland
20th-century Australian judges
21st-century Australian judges
Judges of the Supreme Court of the Australian Capital Territory